Chesno is a Ukrainian public campaign that emerged late 2011 to advance a fair election process. It is widely known for its critical analysis and evaluation of politicians and the Verkhovna Rada (parliament) in Ukraine. The organization provides a public familiarization of political culture and every individual legislator as well as candidates to the People's Deputies of Ukraine in the country.

Its logo is a clove of garlic, which was chosen as a "way for disinfection and fight with impure forces".

History
The movement was started in late 2011 by a group of interested activists along with representatives of a partnership "New Citizen". The movement was founded on 29 October 2011 exactly a year before the next parliamentary elections in Ukraine during the public action "Let's filter the parliament in 24 hours". The purpose is to activate the society in order to cleanse the future parliament from the ignominious deputies. Journalist Svitlana Zalishchuk is one of the founders of the movement.

The public presentation of the movement took place on 9 December 2011, when Chesno members initiated the campaign "Filter the council".

On 23 July 2012, Chesno published its first results of monitoring, according to which only three parliamentary corresponded to the virtue criteria. Those were the vice-chairman of the parliament Mykola Tomenko, Oleksandr Hudyma, and the newly elected former Minister of Economy (Fokin Government) Volodymyr Lanovyi.

On 16 October 2012, Chesno published its results of monitoring for the deputy candidates who run at the electoral districts of the 2012 Ukrainian parliamentary election. In the parliament elected in that election several deputies at the request of Chesno regularly report on their activities in parliament.

Virtue criteria
Every parliamentary or prospective candidate is being evaluated by the "Chesnometer" that consists of several criteria of virtue.

 absence of facts of human rights and freedoms violations 
 immutability of political position according to the will of voters
 no relation to corrupt acts
 transparency of declared income and assets and compliance of those with lifestyle
 personal voting in parliament
 participation in meetings of parliament and committees

Values of Chesno
 Openness
 Independence
 Trust
 Endurance and tolerance
 Transparency
 Networking
 Self-governance
 Consensus
 Goodwill

Coordination board
 Internews-Ukraine
 United Actions Center UA
 Institute of Mass Information
 Committee of voters of Ukraine (CVU)
 Center of political studies and analysis
 Media Law Institute
 Ilko Kucheriv Fund "Democratic Initiatives"
 Souspilnist Foundation (Society)
 Anti-raider Union of Entrepreneurs of Ukraine
 People's Solidarity
 Ukrainian view
 Kholodny-yar Initiative (Cold-ravine)

Principles
The following is a list of 16 development principles and organizational rules for the campaign "Filter the council".

Chesno Funding 
From 1 October 2011 till 31 October 2012, the amount of the financial aid provided received from donors by initiating organisations of the CHESNO campaign totalled USD 860,455. A financial audit was carried out of the use of funds. The audit was financed by the UNITER "Ukraine National Initiatives to Enhance Reforms" Project performed by PACT and supported by USAID, the Swedish International Development Agency (SIDA), the International Renaissance Foundation, OMIDYAR NETWORK FUND, and the International Foundation for Electoral Systems (IFES).

References

External links
  Official website of Chesno
 More details on criteria
 Electua.org - We follow elections

2011 establishments in Ukraine
Political organizations based in Ukraine
Think tanks established in 2011
Think tanks based in Ukraine
Political and economic think tanks based in Europe